is a Japanese auto racing driver. He best known for having competed in the World Touring Car Championship.

Career

Kano competed in karting between 1991 and 1994. He then attended the Winfield Racing School in France in 1995.

Kano finished ninth in the Japanese Super Taikyu Series in 2006. He was runner up to Fariqe Hairuman in the 2007 Asian Touring Car Championship, driving a BMW 320i for Engstler Motorsport, winning the Division 2 category, also finishing third in the Super Taiku Series. The following year he finished third in the Asian Touring Car Championship.

He made his World Touring Car Championship debut for Engstler at the 2008 FIA WTCC Race of Japan; he also raced at the subsequent Race of Macau. He returned to the WTCC for Engstler in the Asian rounds of the 2009, 2010 and 2011 seasons. He joined Engstler Motorsport once again for the 2012 FIA WTCC Race of Japan. For the 2013 FIA WTCC Race of Japan he replaced team boss Franz Engstler, who was unable to race due to illness.

Racing record

Complete World Touring Car Championship results
(key) (Races in bold indicate pole position) (Races in italics indicate fastest lap)

Complete Super GT results

* Season still in progress.

References

External links
 https://web.archive.org/web/20120721023122/http://kano-masaki.com/
 Career statistics from Driver Database

Living people
Japanese racing drivers
World Touring Car Championship drivers
1976 births
Super GT drivers
Engstler Motorsport drivers